Magnus Arvidsson may refer to:

 Magnus Arvidsson (footballer) (born 1973), Swedish football player
 Magnus Arvidsson (javelin thrower) (born 1983), Swedish javelin thrower